Trophon minutus is a species of sea snail, a marine gastropod mollusk in the family Muricidae, the murex snails or rock snails.

Description
The shell can grow to be 7.3 mm in length.

Distribution
It can be found off of the South Georgia Islands, South Sandwich Islands, South Shetland Islands, Antarctic Peninsula, and Antarctica.

References

Gastropods described in 1907
Trophon